Madagascar: Escape 2 Africa is a platform game based on the film of the same name. It was released on the Microsoft Windows, Nintendo DS, PlayStation 2, PlayStation 3, Wii and Xbox 360. The video game's gameplay is similar to the movie's first scenes with the same characters and moves, although the environment is in Africa. The Nintendo Channel released a playable demo of this game on the week of November 7, which shows one of the side-scrolling, Lemmings-esque levels in which the penguins of the series are the main characters.

Plot
8 years after the events of the first game, Alex, Marty, Melman and Gloria (alongside the Penguins, King Julien, Maurice and the Chimps, Mason and Phil) decide to return to the zoo in New York, and travel there using an abandoned plane which was repaired by the penguins. Mort stows away, and ends up making the plane crash before it can arrive. They realize that they are in Africa, their old home. Alex reunites with his father Zuba, the alpha male of his pride, but Zuba's evil friend, Makunga, reminds him that every new lion must pass a rite of passage before being accepted into the pride. Alex nearly succeeds, but fails the last task (yelling his catchphrase), and is not allowed into the pride. Marty joins a herd of zebras identical to him, while Melman and King Julien become the doctors of the giraffes, and Gloria and Maurice kick a group of evil crocodiles out of the watering hole. Gloria then starts going out with a male hippo named Moto-Moto.

Meanwhile, the Penguins scrounge up equipment to fix the plane by stealing it from a nearby human safari camp. Mort eventually manages to get to the watering hole and catch up to the Zoosters after going through a dangerous swamp.

Melman soon becomes jealous of Moto-Moto, admitting that he has feelings for Gloria to Julien, who helps him take pictures of Moto-Moto hanging out with other hippos, but Gloria rejects Melman, who decides to leap into a volcano, but is stopped by Gloria. Melman then wins a dance contest against Moto-Moto, after which he and Gloria confess their love. The two catch up to Alex and Marty, and the four are then informed by King Julien and Maurice that the watering hole dries up, and that there is no more drinking water. The animals investigate, and they realize that a bunch of New Yorkers have built a dam to block the watering hole.

The Penguins and the Chimps, who have finished repairing the plane, take the animals to the humans' camp, where they destroy the dam and the camp. They decide to stay in Africa for a while.

Reception

Madagascar: Escape 2 Africa received "mixed or average" reviews, according to review aggregator Metacritic.

References

External links

2008 video games
3D platform games
Activision games
Aspyr games
Deck Nine games
Madagascar (franchise) video games
Multiplayer and single-player video games
Nintendo DS games
PlayStation 2 games
PlayStation 3 games
Toys for Bob games
Video games developed in the United States
Video games scored by Michael Wandmacher
Video games set in Africa
Video games set in Madagascar
Wii games
Windows games
Xbox 360 games